George Washington Ryland (December 19, 1827July 4, 1910) was an American merchant, banker, and Republican politician.  He served as the 15th Lieutenant Governor of Wisconsin (1887–1891) and operated the first bank in Lancaster, Wisconsin.

Biography
George W. Ryland was born near Selbysport in Garrett County, Maryland.  He was raised and educated there, teaching country school in the winters to pay for his own education.

In April 1853 he moved to Lancaster, Wisconsin, which would be his home for the rest of his life.  He was employed by former Wisconsin governor Nelson Dewey to mow hay, earning a dollar a day.  Later that year, he was employed as a clerk in the store of John Alcorn, and from there became a partner in a general goods store with the brothers John and Simon Lewis.  In 1860, he and his brother-in-law, John Chandler Holloway, bought out a grocery business and its building and constructed a new new brick store in its place.  In that building, they also began operating a bank in 1865.

They eventually closed their mercantile business, sold the old building, and expanded their banking business into a new two-story building under the business name "Ryland & Holloway".

In politics, Ryland was originally a Democrat, and was appointed postmaster at Lancaster during the administration of Franklin Pierce.  He subsequently became a Republican, and was reappointed postmaster under presidents Abraham Lincoln and Andrew Johnson.  As a Republican, Ryland was elected to two terms in the Wisconsin State Senate, serving from 1880 until 1885.  He was subsequently elected Lieutenant Governor of Wisconsin in 1886 and re-elected in 1888.  He was chairman of the town board for 20 years and chairman of the county board for 17 years, leaving both positions in 1891, when his term as Lieutenant Governor expired.

Also during his term as Lieutenant Governor, he became involved in the effort to organize the State Bank of Grant County, which was established in 1888 with Ryland serving as president.  Ryland operated the bank for the next ten years, retiring in 1899.

Ryland died at his home in Lancaster, July 4, 1910.

Electoral history

Wisconsin Senate (1879, 1881)

| colspan="6" style="text-align:center;background-color: #e9e9e9;"| General Election, November 4, 1879

| colspan="6" style="text-align:center;background-color: #e9e9e9;"| General Election, November 8, 1881

Wisconsin Lieutenant Governor (1886, 1888)

| colspan="6" style="text-align:center;background-color: #e9e9e9;"| General Election, November 2, 1886

| colspan="6" style="text-align:center;background-color: #e9e9e9;"| General Election, November 6, 1886

References

External links
 

1827 births
1910 deaths
Wisconsin state senators
19th-century American politicians